The ninth season of the animated television series, Archer, subtitled  Danger Island, premiered on April 25, 2018, on FXX.

Production
FXX announced that season 9 would see a change in the time again, with this series set between 1938 and 1939. Along with the change in the time, the network announced that although the same voice cast will return as in previous seasons, they will again play different versions of their characters. This means that Archer, who was found shot in actress Veronica Deane's pool after season seven, remains in a coma, and the events of the season are of his imagination.

These different versions have similar personalities to their "normal" counterparts but take on different jobs or roles and have different relationships. The season's premise sees Archer as an alcoholic co-pilot with Pam, living on the lush and mysterious Pacific island of Mitimotu.

The season also pays homage to the short-lived 1980s television series Tales of the Gold Monkey which featured a very similar premise as Danger Island. Adam Reed has previously claimed that Tales of the Gold Monkey was "one of my favorite shows ever."

Episodes

References

External links
 
 

2018 American television seasons
Archer (2009 TV series) seasons
Fiction set in 1938
Metafictional television series